The following is a list of Burgos CF managers from the beginning of the club's official managerial records in 1994 to the present day.

Since 1994, Burgos had, with the current one, 18 managers in all its history. The first coach was Félix Arnaiz.

Arnaiz is also the club's longest-serving manager having four spells managing the club from 1994 to 2008, totalling 160 league matches, followed by Carlos Terrazas with 109 and Javier Álvarez de los Mozos with 81. De los Mozos is also the manager who coached more games consecutively.

List of managers
Only league games are counted, not including playoffs.

References 

Burgos
Managers